Obsession is a 1997 Franco-German drama film directed by Peter Sehr and starring Daniel Craig.

The film was released in Germany on 28 August 1997 and premiered in Canada's Toronto International Film Festival on 9 September the same year.

Premise
Two men become entangled in a torrid love affair with the same woman. Pierre is Miriam's longtime lover. John is desperately searching for clues about his past when he and Miriam have a fateful encounter in a Berlin train station. The allure of forbidden love becomes irresistible, and an intense love triangle is ignited. Who will Miriam choose? Who will walk away? For two men who desperately adore the same woman and for the woman who loves them equally there is no easy way out.

Cast
Daniel Craig as John MacHale
Marie-Christine Barrault as Ella Beckmann
Charles Berling as Pierre
Heike Makatsch as Miriam Auerbach
Seymour Cassel as Jacob Frischmuth
Allen Garfield as Simon Frischmuth
Daniel Gélin as Xavier
Mark Strong as Craig's German voice dub

Awards and nominations
1997 – San Sebastián International Film Festival – Recipient: Peter Sehr
1998 – German Film Awards – Categories: Outstanding Feature Film and Outstanding Individual Achievement – Actress Heike Makatsch

References

External links

1997 films
French romantic drama films
German romantic drama films
1990s French-language films
1990s German-language films
1990s English-language films
English-language French films
English-language German films
1997 romantic drama films
Films set in Berlin
Films set in Paris
1990s French films
1990s German films